Kuchak is a Persian surname. Notable people with the name include:
 Hasan Kuchak (1319–1343), Mongol ruler
 Nahapet Kuchak (died 1592), Armenian medieval poet

References 

surnames
Persian-language surnames